The Irell & Manella Graduate School of Biological Sciences (formerly the City of Hope Graduate School of Biological Sciences) is a graduate school for biology in the City of Hope National Medical Center in Duarte, California.

Program
The Irell & Manella Graduate School of Biological Sciences is a doctoral and masters program that trains students to become research scientists with expertise in chemical, molecular, and cellular biology. Graduates of this program are awarded the degree of Doctor of Philosophy (Ph.D.) in Biological Sciences or the degree of Master of Science (M.S.) in Translational Medicine, and as such are equipped to address fundamental questions in the life sciences and biomedicine. Most graduates pursue careers in academia, industry, or government.

The school is housed at the Beckman Research Institute of the City of Hope National Medical Center. It is accredited by the Accrediting Commission for Senior Colleges and Universities of the Western Association of Schools and Colleges.

See also
Beckman Research Institute
City of Hope National Medical Center

References

External links

Biological research institutes in the United States
Universities and colleges in Los Angeles County, California
Medical research institutes in the United States
1994 establishments in California
Educational institutions established in 1994
Science and technology in Greater Los Angeles
Private universities and colleges in California
City of Hope National Medical Center